William Gregory Steube (born May 19, 1978) is an American attorney and politician serving as the U.S. representative for  since 2019. His district stretches across a large swath of south-central Florida, from the outer suburbs of Sarasota and Fort Myers through the Everglades to the shores of Lake Okeechobee. A member of the Republican Party, Steube served three terms in the Florida House of Representatives, representing the Sarasota-Manatee area from 2010 to 2016, as well as two years in the Florida Senate until 2018, representing Sarasota County and the western part of Charlotte County.

Early life
Steube was born in Bradenton to Brad Steube, who served as Sheriff of Manatee County. He graduated from Southeast High School in 1996. He attended the University of Florida, receiving a degree in Animal Science in 2000, and then his Juris Doctor from the Fredric G. Levin College of Law in 2003. At UF, Steube was a brother of Alpha Gamma Rho fraternity. After graduation, Steube joined the United States Army and attended The JAG School at the University of Virginia and entered U.S. Army JAG Corps. He served from 2004 to 2008 and deployed to Iraq in support of Operation Iraqi Freedom.

Florida House of Representatives

When State Representative Ron Reagan was unable to seek reelection in 2010 due to term limits, Steube ran to succeed him in the 67th District, based in southern Hillsborough County, eastern Manatee County, and northern Sarasota County, stretching from Apollo Beach to Fruitville. He received an endorsement from U.S. Representative Vern Buchanan, who called Steube "extremely knowledgeable of the district and the district's issues." In the Republican primary, he defeated Jeremiah J. Guccione and Robert McCann with 53% of the vote to Guccione's 28% and McCann's 19%. He advanced to the general election, where he faced Democratic nominee Z. J. Hafeez and independent candidate John M. Studebaker. Steube won 68% of the vote to Hafeez's 27% and Studebaker's 5%.

After the reconfiguration of state legislative districts in 2012, Steube's district was renumbered the 73rd district. The district was pushed further into Sarasota County while losing its share of Hillsborough County. Steube won his party's nomination unopposed, and moved on to the general election, facing only Bob McCann, who had previously run against Steube in the 2010 Republican primary, but was running as an independent. Steube and McCann disagreed over whether the state should expand Medicaid under the Patient Protection and Affordable Care Act, with Steube opposed and McCann in favor, and over whether the state should fund charter schools, with Steube in favor and McCann opposed. Steube was endorsed by the Bradenton Herald, which praised him for his "strong first term and his qualifications", specifically calling him out for working to put two constitutional amendments on the ballot that provide tax exemptions to the spouses of deceased military veterans and property tax relief to low-income seniors. Steube defeated McCann with 74% of the vote. In 2014, Steube was reelected to his third term in the legislature without opposition.

Florida Senate 
In 2016, Steube ran for the Florida Senate seat vacated by Nancy Detert, who was term limited. He defeated four other candidates in the Republican primary, receiving 31% of the vote, and won the general election against Democrat Frank Alcock, 59 to 41%.

U.S. House of Representatives

Elections

2018 

Steube ran for the Republican nomination for Florida's 17th Congressional District in 2018, a seat that was being vacated by Tom Rooney, who declined to seek reelection. He won the August 28 Republican primary. In the November 6 general election, he defeated Democrat Allen Ellison, who replaced the original Democratic nominee, April Freeman, after she died unexpectedly in September.

2020 

Steube was reelected in 2020 with 64.6% of the vote, defeating Democrat Allen Ellison.

Tenure
Steube supports repealing the Affordable Care Act. During the COVID-19 pandemic, Steube argued that the "deep state" at the FDA was preventing the usage of hydroxychloroquine, an antimalarial drug, to treat COVID-19.

In December 2020, Steube was one of 126 Republican members of the House of Representatives to sign an amicus brief in support of Texas v. Pennsylvania, a lawsuit filed at the United States Supreme Court contesting the results of the 2020 presidential election, in which Joe Biden defeated incumbent Donald Trump. The Supreme Court declined to hear the case on the basis that Texas lacked standing under Article III of the Constitution to challenge the results of an election held by another state.

On January 6–7, 2021, Steube voted not to certify the election of Joe Biden as President.  On January 13, Steube voted against the Second Impeachment of Donald Trump.

In October 2020 and again in January 2021, Steube introduced a bill to stop technology platforms from suspending right-wing accounts.

In late February 2021, Steube and a dozen other Republican House members skipped votes and enlisted others to vote for them, citing the ongoing COVID-19 pandemic, but he and the other members were actually attending the Conservative Political Action Conference, which was held at the same time as their slated absences. In response, the Campaign for Accountability, an ethics watchdog group, filed a complaint with the House Committee on Ethics and requested an investigation into Steube and the other lawmakers.

In June 2021, Steube was among 21 House Republicans who voted against a resolution to give the Congressional Gold Medal to police officers who defended the U.S. Capitol on January 6.

In June 2021, Steube was one of 49 House Republicans to vote to repeal the AUMF against Iraq.

Committee assignments 
Committee on the Judiciary
Subcommittee on Crime, Terrorism and Homeland Security
Subcommittee on Antitrust, Commercial and Administrative Law
Subcommittee on Immigration and Citizenship
Committee on Oversight and Reform
Subcommittee on Government Operations
Committee on Veterans' Affairs
Subcommittee on Disability Assistance and Memorial Affairs
Subcommittee on Health

Caucus memberships 
Freedom Caucus
Republican Study Committee

Personal life 
Steube and his wife, Jennifer, have one son.

He was admitted to Sarasota Memorial Hospital with multiple injuries, including a punctured lung, fractured pelvis, and torn neck ligaments. He was released from the hospital on January 21.

Steube is a Methodist.

Electoral history
Six weeks before the 2018 election, Steube's Democratic opponent, 54-year-old April Freeman, was found dead. The cause of death was a heart attack. A replacement, Allen Ellison, was appointed, but ballots were already printed. Rather than reprint, Ellison's name was left off of the ballot.

References

External links

 Congressman Greg Steube official U.S. House website
Greg Steube for Congress
 
Florida House of Representatives - Greg Steube

|-

|-

|-

|-

1978 births
Living people
21st-century American politicians
United States Army personnel of the Iraq War
American military lawyers
American Methodists
Republican Party Florida state senators
Republican Party members of the Florida House of Representatives
People from Bradenton, Florida
People from Sarasota, Florida
Republican Party members of the United States House of Representatives from Florida
Methodists from Florida
United States Army officers
Fredric G. Levin College of Law alumni
The Judge Advocate General's Legal Center and School alumni